Dreadlocks Ltd is a Czech video game developer based in Prague. The company's first game, Rune Legend, was the winner of 5th AppParade. The company was officially formed in 2011. The company's most recent release is Dex, an action role-playing game.

History
Dreadlocks was established in 2011 by a group of students from Czech Technical University in Prague. The idea of forming a studio was based on a game engine created by them for their bachelor work. Their first project was Rune Legend, a mobile game that was released in 2012. The studio then focused on creating a game titled Enlightened, but its development was suspended when the company acquired a team that worked on the video game Dex, which was successfully funded through Kickstarter and released in May 2015.

Ghost Theory, a horror ghost hunting game, was announced at the Game Developers Session 2015 and was scheduled to be released in Q4 2017. In April 2016, the crowdfunding project went live on Kickstarter. In January 2019, the project stalled as the developers have made a game engine switch from Unity to CryEngine. Dreadlocks underwent financial problems after failing to get funding from Crytek's Indie Development Fund. The studio decided to focus on smaller projects to fund the further development of Ghost Theory.

British subsidiary
The company also has a United Kingdom subsidiary which is based in Northampton that serves as help with legal issues and an earlier availability of certain technologies or services to British developers. An example is a Kickstarter campaign for Dex.

Mobile division
In May 2017, Dreadlocks acquired Silicon Jelly, the team responsible for the Mimpi video game series. Silicon Jelly became Dreadlocks Mobile.

Games

Developed by Dreadlocks Mobile/Silicon Jelly

References

External links
 English version of company site

Video game companies of the Czech Republic
Video game companies established in 2011
Companies based in Prague
Czech companies established in 2011
Video game development companies